Bhiwani was a Lok Sabha parliamentary constituency in Haryana until 2008. Later parts of it came under the newly devised Bhiwani-Mahendragarh (Lok Sabha constituency).

Members of Parliament

For post-2008 results, see Bhiwani-Mahendragarh

See also
 Bhiwani
 List of Constituencies of the Lok Sabha
 Bhiwani-Mahendragarh (Lok Sabha constituency)

References 

Former Lok Sabha constituencies of Haryana
Former constituencies of the Lok Sabha
2008 disestablishments in India
Constituencies disestablished in 2008